The Ittihad Party was a radical Islamist party in the Azerbaijan Democratic Republic in 1917–1920. It was formed in September 1917 in opposition to the secular Musavat Party and proposed political unity of all the Muslims of the Russian Empire (ittihad in Arabic means "union"). In addition to propagating the legalization of the Sharia law within the Muslim communities, the goal of the Ittihadists was to prevent the formation of independent nation-states on the Muslim-populated territories of the Russian Empire. In 1918, Ittihad with 11 members became the second largest party in Azerbaijan's parliament. The Ittihadists' vehement opposition to Musavat, which formed the minority government in Azerbaijan in 1918–1920, led to their collaboration with the White Russians under Anton Denikin. Upon the defeat of the latter, Ittihad started leaning politically towards the approaching Bolsheviks who eventually Sovietized Azerbaijan on 28 April 1920. By that time, the Ittihad leaders had made a statement declaring the fulfillment of their goals and urging their members to join the newly formed Azerbaijan Communist Party. The leader of the party, Dr. Gara Garabeyov, eventually émigrated to Turkey.

See also
Azerbaijani National Council
Musavat
Muslim Social Democratic Party
 Asad bey Amirov
 Bahram bey Vazirov

References

Defunct political parties in Azerbaijan
Pre-1920 political parties in Azerbaijan
Political parties of the Russian Revolution
Islamic organizations based in Azerbaijan
Islamism in Asia
Islamism in Europe